Samokov Knoll (Samokovska Mogila \'sa-mo-kov-ska mo-'gi-la\) is a peak of elevation 602 m in Yankov Gap area, Livingston Island in the South Shetland Islands, Antarctica.  Surmounting Kaliakra Glacier to the northwest and Struma Glacier to the southeast.

The peak was first visited by the Bulgarians Lyubomir Ivanov and Doychin Vasilev from Camp Academia on 28 December 2004, as part of Tangra 2004/05 survey, and is named after the town of Samokov in Southwestern Bulgaria.

Location

Maps
 L.L. Ivanov et al. Antarctica: Livingston Island and Greenwich Island, South Shetland Islands. Scale 1:100000 topographic map. Sofia: Antarctic Place-names Commission of Bulgaria, 2005.
 L.L. Ivanov. Antarctica: Livingston Island and Greenwich, Robert, Snow and Smith Islands. Scale 1:120000 topographic map.  Troyan: Manfred Wörner Foundation, 2009.

References
 Samokov Knoll. SCAR Composite Antarctic Gazetteer
 Bulgarian Antarctic Gazetteer. Antarctic Place-names Commission. (details in Bulgarian, basic data in English)

External links
 Samokov Knoll. Copernix satellite image

Hills of Livingston Island
Samokov